Lee Brahim Murray-Lamrani (born 12 November 1977) is an English-Moroccan mixed martial arts fighter and criminal. In 2005, his MMA career was cut short after he was stabbed multiple times outside a Mayfair nightclub. He was arrested in Rabat, Morocco, in June 2006 and sentenced to 10 years in prison in June 2010, for masterminding the armed Securitas depot robbery in Kent, England, where £53,116,760 of cash bank notes belonging to the Bank of England were stolen by Murray and his associates on 22 February 2006. It was the largest known cash robbery in the world during peacetime. After a foiled attempt to escape prison and a failed appeal, his jail term was extended to 25 years on 30 November 2010. He is currently being held at a prison in Tifelt, northwestern Morocco, and despite being incarcerated fathered a child from prison in 2010. In 2018, Murray in an interview stated he was training to fight in prison, and still planned a UFC comeback, with the hope of securing a pardon from King Mohammed VI of Morocco.

UFC president Dana White commented on Murray, that "He's a scary son of a bitch, and I don't mean fighter-wise".

Early life
On his mother Barbara Murray's side, Lee's family hails from Bermondsey, a densely populated semi-docklands part of south London between Tower Bridge and the Old Kent Road which is considered a traditional breeding ground for professional criminals, especially armed robbers.

Barbara was a hairdresser and later a telephonist. On a holiday to Gran Canaria she met Lee's father, Brahim Lamrani, a kitchen hand from the southern Moroccan city of Sidi Ifni. The couple's first child, Lee, was born in St Nicholas Hospital, Plumstead, on 12 November 1977, and was initially raised by his mother while Brahim continued to live and work in the Canary Islands. Eventually he moved to England and married Barbara in 1984 and in 1985 she gave birth to Lee's only sibling, Rkia.

The family lived at 11 Buttmarsh Close, Plumstead, and Murray attended Foxfield Primary School, where he met his future wife, Siobhan Rowlings, three years his junior. Murray's closest associates at this point were boys from Buttmarsh and the surrounding estates who called themselves the "Buttmarsh Boys;" described as "happy kids" who used to "play like normal kids on the estate," the boys fought to establish an internal pecking order and believed they had a duty to "look after" Buttmarsh, sometimes engaging in fights with boys from neighbouring estates. A skinny youngster, Murray's preferred method of attack was running into battle wind-milling his arms around his head with a "manic" expression on his face, a maneuver which, combined with his protruding ears, earned him the nickname of "Alien," which he hated.

Murray had a difficult relationship with his father, who was often drunk and described as a "frightening, violent man" who was "volatile and domineering." Largely absent from the first seven years of his life, Brahim demanded his respect and obedience, to the point of a police warning for mistreatment. Eventually, Lee began to fight back against his father.  The next-door neighbour heard that Brahim "actually went and hit Lee and Lee snapped, just turned round and knocked his Dad clean out...once he realised he could take down a big man like that I think that's what changed Lee into the man he is now – a thug."

Their relationship grew so tempestuous that Brahim felt living together would result in a death so he moved out. Barbara was then left to raise Lee and Rkia largely on her own.

At this time, Lee began attending Eaglesfield Boys School, which is where he met his eventual best friend and partner-in-crime, Paul Allen. Murray, who enjoyed reading and puzzles, was a sub-par student mainly doing well in football, failing to make the school team. Teachers found him unmanageable, he was expelled and found enrolment at Woolwich Polytechnic School to complete the statutory years of school. By then, Murray was living on the streets and was a member of a gang based on the Barnfield Estate , with stealing and drug-dealing a part of everyday activity; he and his friends were allegedly in daily contact with Nigerian drug dealers who operated at Plumstead train station, and an eventual turf war broke out that saw Murray and his friends win a local territory in drug trading.

Murray was eventually convicted of possession of cocaine and cannabis, was named in the Old Bailey as a notorious London drug dealer who employed Paul Allen as his right-hand man plus a network of drug runners. One of his best friends from this time was a local ruffian and future mixed martial artist named Mark "The Beast" Epstein, who claimed that he and Lee sold crack cocaine and Lee "made a lot of money from that." Murray also proved himself adept at the more violent side of selling drugs, typically to control territory and make sure customers pay. Murray himself claimed that "some people would probably say I was a bully, but a bully to me is someone that goes for easy targets and people who can't fight back. Me, I went for all targets." Murray was known for punching people almost at random in the street, as well as habitually harassing a man who ran a local corner shop.

Murray was sentenced to a term at Feltham Young Offenders Institution, the first of his custodial sentences for what ranked as his more minor offences such as assault and thievery; others followed in Dover and Norwich. Upon emerging from Feltham, Murray devoted energy to the gym, lifting weights and drinking weight-gain shakes to add bulk to his lanky, 6' frame. Joining him was Allen, who by then was known as "The Enforcer", presumably from drug-dealing activity.

Murray and Allen were soon using steroids and spending the money they earned from selling drugs on luxury cars. The police stopped Murray regularly, and, because they suspected he was a drug dealer, attempted to place an informer in his gang but could not gain enough evidence to prosecute Murray. He was contemptuous of the police, often mocking and intimidating them on the streets, sometimes following officers around in his car. Some officers at Plumstead Police Station told his biographer others felt wary, it would be best not to aggravate him and added "he's a very dangerous man."

Rowlings, Murray's girlfriend, gave birth to their first child, Lilly Jane on 24 December 1998. Weeks later, Murray was caught up in a turf war with rival drug dealers that led to the arrest of Epstein and more than a dozen others, many ending up in prison. Murray, however, got "clean away," with Epstein saying that "he was the only one that slipped through the net. I mean, lucky boy! But he's always been lucky... I went to prison for three years."

Murray married Rowlings on 24 November 2000, listing himself on their wedding certificate as a "professional fighter." Murray would later divorce Rowlings in 2008 while incarcerated in Morocco.

Mixed martial arts career
Shortly after dodging arrest Murray was introduced to mixed martial arts, and he competed in his first fight on 5 December 1999 at an event called "Millennium Brawl" that was held at Hemel Hempstead Pavilion. His opponent was Rob Hudson, and Murray knocked him out in the first round, prompting event promoter Andy Jardine to say, "He was so quick they called him 'Lightning' Lee Murray."

Murray's successful debut led him to begin training seriously; he jogged around the Abbey Wood Estate and attended two gyms – London Shootfighters in White City for wrestling, and Peacock's Gym in Canning Town for boxing. Martin Bowers, who ran Peacock's with his brothers Tony and Paul, described Murray as "a very nice boy" who "conducted himself well." Bowers said that Murray reminded him of many other young men who he had seen in his gym over the years, men who had come from troubled backgrounds but whose lives were given structure by sport. At the same time that Murray was training at Peacock's Gym the Bowers brothers were planning a series of robberies, the biggest being a brazen raid on a high-security warehouse at Gatwick Airport; their scheme involved disguising themselves as security officers, using a fake Brink's-Mat van to get into the depot, and then stealing £1 million in foreign currency. After Scotland Yard found out about the planned heist all three brothers were arrested and jailed; it has been speculated that while Murray had no prior knowledge about the caper, the schematics that were later revealed publicly may have given him some of the ideas that were used in the similar Securitas depot robbery.

Murray had four professional fights in 2000; the first was a 12 March encounter with Mike Tomlinson under the banner of "Ring of Truth." Murray won the fight via a kimura submission in the first round, but it was in February 2004 that he would expand on some of the events surrounding the fight. Writing on a message board in a now-archived thread from the mixed martial arts website Sherdog, Murray told the story of watching the Prince Naseem Hamed vs. Vuyani Bungu fight at a pub the night before his own match with Tomlinson; when a patron stood in front of Murray and then accused him of stealing his seat after being asked to move, Murray allegedly knocked the man, and his friend who attempted to aid him, unconscious, followed by knee strikes to knock out a bartender who rushed to break up the fight. The following morning – and day of his fight with Tomlinson – Murray was unable to close his left hand. After taping the hand, Murray relied solely on his good (right) hand, stating that he "caught him [Tomlinson] with a few good rights... he was rocked so he took me down then I caught him in a keylock on the ground and won the fight... after that I went to the hospital and got my hand plastered up, it was broke in two places."

Murray's next two bouts took place on 17 June 2000 in a tournament fought at Extreme Challenge 34. Murray defeated his first opponent, Chris Albandia, by ankle lock in the first round. Murray later said that he thought Albandia was a kickboxer because he was wearing Thai shorts, so he started the fight out with leg kicks. When Albandia surprised Murray by performing a single-leg takedown, Murray said he "sprawled and took him to the side of the cage where I was kneeing him and punching constantly. He dropped again and took me down, going for a leglock. So I grabbed his leg and went to trade leglocks with him. I cranked an achilles lock on and I think it must have snapped because there was a real loud crack. Even Pat heard it in my corner and when Chris got up he couldn't put weight on it. So I won that one."

The victory advanced Murray to the second round of the tournament, but he lost by armbar to Canadian submission specialist Joe Doerksen in the opening round. Murray said that when he "went into the final, I was so happy and excited about winning the first I just sort of lost my focus...[Doerksen's] a BJJ [[[Brazilian jiu-jitsu]]] guy who's only ever lost to Matt Hughes and Eugene Jackson. Anyway, he just took me straight to the ground. I didn't even make him pay while he tried. He launched a three sub attack at me with me in his guard. I fended off two and then got submitted with a keylock. I learnt a lot from that fight."

Murray's next fight was just weeks later, a 9 July contest against Danny Rushton, a fighter who had gained a reputation for toughness due to his competing in true no-holds-barred competitions in Russia. The match ended up a no-contest, however, after Rushton collapsed in the first round due to exhaustion.

At some point in 2000, Murray travelled to Bettendorf, Iowa to train at the renowned Miletich Fighting Systems camp run by former UFC welterweight champion Pat Miletich. In an interview conducted before the Rushton fight, Murray stated that while at MFS he trained a "hell of a lot of ground work. And a lot of kickboxing too. I prefer standup. Well, I just prefer to strike really. I like to keep the fight standing up and punch. Mind you, I like to punch from the mount too. I like to strike."

On 11 March 2001, Murray fought to a draw against Chris Bacon at Millennium Brawl 2: Capital Punishment; he followed that up with a first-round knockout of Gary Warren at Millennium Brawl 3: Independence Day on 1 July.

On 11 September 2004, Lee fought future UFC middleweight champion Anderson Silva in Cage Rage 8 for the vacant middleweight title. Silva won by unanimous decision.

Murray amassed an 8-2-1 (1NC) record in smaller promotions before receiving a contract with the Ultimate Fighting Championship (UFC). In his UFC debut, he defeated Jorge Rivera by triangle choke/armbar in the first round. This was Murray's only fight in the UFC due to complications with his US visa as a result of ongoing criminal prosecution against him in the UK for assault, after he attacked a man during a road rage incident. This led to Murray signing with the Cage Rage promotion, which was also short-lived, due to injuries resulting from a stabbing, which prevented Murray from continuing his MMA career.

Street brawls
Witnesses claim Murray was involved in a scuffle with then-UFC light heavyweight champion Tito Ortiz outside a nightclub in London after UFC 38 in July 2002, in which Murray allegedly fought Ortiz. Murray asserts he knocked Ortiz out – a claim substantiated by Matt Hughes in his book Made in America: The Most Dominant Champion in UFC History, as well as Pat Miletich during an interview with ESPN, and also the announcer Bruce Buffer in Mike Tyson's Hotboxin''' podcast. However Tito Ortiz denies he was knocked out. Chuck Liddell has also stated that he did not see Tito knocked unconscious.

On 28 September 2005, Murray was hospitalised after being stabbed in a brawl during the birthday party of British glamour model Lauren Pope. He suffered a punctured lung and a severed artery. According to the doctor who performed the life saving surgery on Murray, he was resuscitated four times during the operation that saved his life.  When thanked, the doctor remarked that Lee should thank the nurses who ran the bags of blood from the blood bank, because that was what saved his life.

Securitas Depot robbery

On 25 June 2006, in a joint operation with Moroccan police, Murray was arrested at a shopping centre in the Souissi district of the capital Rabat for suspected involvement in the Securitas depot robbery. Moroccan police said they had to use "specialist techniques to arrest the suspects because they were specialists in martial arts and firearms". Kent Police said in a statement that they had been tracking Murray for three months and would be seeking his extradition from Morocco. There is no treaty between the UK and Morocco, and the process was expected to take months. Later, Moroccan police revealed that Murray had also been charged with possession of "hard drugs". On 27 June 2006, Kent Police confirmed the news of Murray's arrest in Morocco, and also stated that over 30 people had now been arrested in conjunction with the investigation.

In June 2009, Murray attempted to escape Salé prison. Small saws were found in a plate of biscuits in Murray's cell by another prisoner who broke into it. Prison officials believe Murray was planning to cut through the iron bars of his cell window with the saws. To make the escape through the small window easier, Murray had lost a significant amount of weight. Murray was in a different cell at the time as punishment for being caught with a laptop computer (with internet access) and five kilos of drugs. Other prisoners in Salé held it against Murray that he was able to use his money to smuggle in items like these, as well as expensive clothes. The fellow prisoner who broke into his cell was doing so to steal some of Murray's belongings.  He was convicted of the £53m crime in a Moroccan court in June 2010. Kent Police said Murray must serve 10 years in jail in Morocco for his involvement. This sentence was then extended to 25 years on 30 November 2010.

Film biography
Time Inc. announced on 4 August 2008 that they would be making a film about Lee Murray's alleged role in the robbery, based on an article about him in Sports Illustrated called "Breaking the Bank". In addition to the robbery, the film will also concentrate on Murray's life, including his mixed martial arts career. In March 2023, Showtime announced the airing of their four episode docuseries Catching Lightning'' as part of its original programming for April 2023.

Mixed martial arts record

|-
| Loss
| align=center| 8–2–1 (1)
| Anderson Silva
| Decision (unanimous)
| Cage Rage 8
| 
| align=center| 3
| align=center| 5:00
| Wembley Conference Centre, London, England
| 
|-
| Win
| align=center| 8–1–1 (1)
| Jorge Rivera
| Submission (triangle armbar)
| UFC 46
| 
| align=center| 1
| align=center| 1:45
| Mandalay Bay Events Center, Las Vegas, Nevada
| 
|-
| Win
| align=center| 7–1–1 (1)
| Jose Landi-Jons
| KO (punches)
| EF 1: Genesis
| 
| align=center| 2
| align=center| 0:32
| London, England
| 
|-
| Win
| align=center| 6–1–1 (1)
| Amir Rahnavardi
| KO (punches)
| Millennium Brawl 8
| 
| align=center| 1
| align=center| 0:04
| High Wycombe Judo Centre, High Wycombe, England
| 
|-
| Win
| align=center| 5–1–1 (1)
| Kama Boumna
| Submission (armbar)
| Millenium Brawl 7
| 
| align=center| 1
| align=center| 0:20
| High Wycombe Judo Centre, High Wycombe, England
| 
|-
| Win
| align=center| 4–1–1 (1)
| Gary Warren
| KO (punch)
| MB 3: Independence Day
| 
| align=center| 1
| align=center| N/A
| High Wycombe Judo Centre, High Wycombe, England
| 
|-
| Draw
| align=center| 3–1–1 (1)
| Chris Bacon
| Draw
| MB 2: Capital Punishment
| 
| align=center| 3
| align=center| 5:00
| High Wycombe Judo Centre, High Wycombe, England
| 
|-
| NC
| align=center| 3–1 (1)
| Danny Rushton
| No Contest
| ROT 2: Ring of Truth 2
| 
| align=center| 1
| align=center| 4:00
| England
| 
|-
| Loss
| align=center| 3–1
| Joe Doerksen
| Submission (armbar)
| EC 34: Extreme Challenge 34
| 
| align=center| 1
| align=center| 1:19
| Hayward, Wisconsin, United States
| 
|-
| Win
| align=center| 3–0
| Chris Albandia
| Submission (heel hook)
| EC 34: Extreme Challenge 34
| 
| align=center| 1
| align=center| 2:23
| Hayward, Wisconsin, United States
| 
|-
| Win
| align=center| 2–0
| Mike Tomlinson
| Submission (kimura)
| ROT 1: Ring of Truth 1
| 
| align=center| 1
| align=center| 0:56
| England
| 
|-
| Win
| align=center| 1–0
| Rob Hudson
| KO (punches)
| MB 1: The Beginning
| 
| align=center| 1
| align=center| 0:20
| England
|

References

External links
 
 
 Lee Murray MMA record

Further reading

1977 births
Living people
English male mixed martial artists
Middleweight mixed martial artists
21st-century English criminals
English male criminals
British bank robbers
English drug traffickers
English gangsters
Moroccan gangsters
Criminals from London
People from Woolwich
English people of Moroccan descent
Ultimate Fighting Championship male fighters
Organised crime in London